Mops or MOPS may refer to:

 More than one mop (plural noun); a form of the verb "to mop"
 MOPS, or 3-(N-morpholino)propanesulfonic acid, a buffer in protein chemistry
 MoPS, the UK government's Manual of Protective Security, superseded by the Security Policy Framework
 Mops (genus), a genus of free-tailed bat
 The Mops, a Japanese rock group
 Mean of Platts Singapore, a measure of fuel oil pricing in Singapore
 MOPS International (Mothers of Preschoolers), an international organization
 Minimum operational performance standards, see Traffic collision avoidance system

See also
 µops, an abbreviation for Micro-operation
 
 MOP (disambiguation)
 Weighted million operations per second (WMOPS), see Instructions per second